Chandrasena is a 1935 Hindi/Marathi/Tamil mythology drama film directed by V. Shantaram for his Prabhat Film Company. The film was the first Indian trilingual film to be made simultaneously in Hindi, Marathi and Tamil. The cinematographer was K. Dhiaber and the story and dialogue were by Shivram Vashikar. The music direction was by Keshavrao Bhole, with lyrics written by K. Narayan Kale. The cast included Nalini Tarkhud, Sureshbabu Mane, Kelkar, Rajani, Shantabai and Azurie.

The film was a remake of the Shantaram and Dhaiber-directed Marathi film Chandrasena of 1931. The story revolves around an episode in the Ramayana, where Chandrasena, wife of Ahiravan, (Mahiravan's (brother), helps Hanuman defeat Mahiravana's army, and in the process free Rama and Lakshmana from Pataal.

Plot
Indrajit, Son of Ravana, has Rama and Lakshmana kidnapped by Ahiravan and Mahiravana. Mahi hides them away in Pataal. Hanuman, the monkey-god, goes to their help. He is stopped by Makardhwaja, whom he defeats. Makar takes him to Chandrasena, wife of Mahi, who worships Rama and desires to spend her life with him. With her help, Hanuman manages to defeat the entire army of Mahi and ultimately Mahi himself when he continues to multiply into a vast army. Chandrasena tells Hanuman the secret of destroying Mahi, because of which he is able to release Rama and Lakshmana from Pataal.

Cast
 Nalini Tarkhad as Chandrasena
 Rajni
 Sureshbabu Mane as Ram
 Kulkarni as Lakshman
 Mane Pahelwan
 Kelkar as Mahiravan
 Manajirao as Hanuman
 Buwasaheb
 Shantabai
 Azurie

Production
The film is cited to be the first to make use of the trolley. It made excessive use of special effects, especially showing flying figures, magic arrows and a gigantic Hanuman.

Remakes
Several remakes of the episode from the Ramayana involving the episode of Chandrasena have been produced. This 1935 version itself was made both in Hindi, Marathi and Tamil. The Prabhat Film Company had made the early version Chandrasena in 1931. Homi Wadia made Chandrasena (1959) under his Basant Pictures banner, which was directed by Babubhai Mistry.

Soundtrack
The music composer for the film was Keshavrao Bhole, with lyrics written by K. Narayan Kale. The singers were Rajni, Nalini Tarkhud, Sureshbabu Mane and Buwa Saheb.

Song List

References

External links

1935 films
Prabhat Film Company films
Films directed by V. Shantaram
1930s Marathi-language films
1930s Tamil-language films
1930s Hindi-language films
Indian black-and-white films
Indian adventure films
1935 adventure films
Indian multilingual films
1935 multilingual films